RWD may refer to:

 Real world data, medical data derived from multiple sources and heterogeneous patient populations in real-world settings
 Rear-wheel drive, method of propulsion in an automobile
 Rear window defogger, a system to defog/defrost glass in a vehicle's rear window
 Responsive web design, a methodology for designing web sites that can adapt to a range of screen sizes and device types
 RWD (aircraft manufacturer), Polish aircraft manufacturer
 RWD Magazine, a British-based music magazine